William "Rookie" Brown (February 15, 1925 – May 22, 1971) was an American professional basketball player in the United States' National Basketball League (NBL). He played for the Dayton Rens in 10 games during the 1948–49 season. He played collegiately at Virginia Union University and Howard University.

Brown died in Neptune, New Jersey at age 46 from cancer.

References

1925 births
1971 deaths
American men's basketball players
Basketball players from Philadelphia
Deaths from cancer in New Jersey
Centers (basketball)
Dayton Rens players
Forwards (basketball)
Harlem Globetrotters players
Howard Bison men's basketball players
Virginia Union Panthers men's basketball players